Favoritism or favouritism may refer to:

 In-group favoritism, a pattern of favoring members of one's own group 
Cronyism, partiality in awarding advantages to friends or trusted colleagues
Nepotism, favoritism granted to relatives and family members
 Outgroup favoritism, positive regard for groups to which one does not belong (see System justification)

See also
 Ingroups and outgroups, social groups to which one identifies or does not identify as being a member
 Bias, inclination toward or against an individual, group, or ideology
 Favor (disambiguation)
 Favorite (disambiguation)